Kelly Purwanto (born August 3, 1983 in Indonesia) is an Indonesian professional basketball player. He currently plays for Bogor Siliwangi of the Indonesian basketball league.  He was also a member of the Indonesia national basketball team.

Purwanto competed for the Indonesia national basketball team at the FIBA Asia Championship 2009 for the first time.

References

1983 births
Living people
Indonesian men's basketball players
Pelita Jaya Esia players
Point guards
Shooting guards
Islamic Solidarity Games competitors for Indonesia